Jakob Lindros (born 1885) was an Estonian politician. He was a member of Estonian Constituent Assembly.

References

Members of the Estonian Constituent Assembly
1885 births
Year of death missing